Salutations is the eighth solo studio album by American musician Conor Oberst, released on March 17, 2017 on Nonesuch Records. Ten of the tracks originally appeared on Ruminations in acoustic form.

Track listing

Personnel
 Pearl Charles – backing vocals (12)
 Daphne Chen – violin (8, 9, 14)
 Richard Dodd – cello (8, 9, 14)
 Greg Farley – violin (1–11, 13–16), backing vocals (1, 3, 4)
 Ian Felice – electric guitar (1–11, 13–16), backing vocals (3, 4, 14, 16)
 James Felice – piano (13–15), organ (6, 10, 11, 13), Wurlitzer (3, 7, 9, 15, 16), accordion (1, 2, 4, 5, 8, 10, 11, 13–15), backing vocals (1, 3, 4, 6, 8, 11, 14)
 Eric Gorfain – violin (8, 9, 14)
 Jim James – backing vocals (2, 3, 10, 14)
 Leah Katz – viola (8, 9, 14)
 Jim Keltner – drums (1–17), percussion (3, 6, 8, 12, 14, 16, 17)
 Andy LeMaster – backing vocals (1, 3, 4, 6, 11)
 Blake Mills – guitar (10), electric guitar (14), baritone guitar (7), guitarrón (7)
 Conor Oberst – vocals (1–17), guitar (4, 7, 9, 11, 13, 15, 16), electric guitar (3, 6, 12), piano (1, 2, 5, 8, 10, 17), Wurlitzer (14), harmonica (1, 2, 4, 5, 7–11, 14–16)
 Josh Rawson – bass (1–11, 13–16), backing vocals (3)
 Gus Seyffert – bass (12, 17)
 Maria Taylor – backing vocals (9, 13)
 M. Ward – guitar (15)
 Gillian Welch – backing vocals (7, 15)
 Jonathan Wilson – guitar (12, 17), piano (12, 17), synthesizer (12, 17)

Charts

References

2017 albums
Conor Oberst albums
Nonesuch Records albums